Piet van den Brekel (21 July 1932 – 18 July 1999) was a Dutch professional racing cyclist. He rode in the 1956 Tour de France.

References

External links
 

1932 births
1999 deaths
Dutch male cyclists
People from Echt-Susteren
Cyclists from Limburg (Netherlands)